Apakidze is a Georgian surname. Notable people with the surname include:

Apakidze (noble family), noble family in Georgia
Andria Apakidze (1914–2005), Georgian archaeologist and historian 
Timur Apakidze (1954–2001), Russo-Georgian naval aviator 

Georgian-language surnames